Ansha Singh (born 4 February 1986) at Bettiah, Bihar, is an Indian national women's team former footballer who played as a defender for the India women's national team. She is currently captain of Indian Railways women's team and working  at East Central Railway zone, Indian Railways, Hajipur.

Career
Singh capped for India at senior level during the 2005 AFC Women's championship qualification round. Her major career achievement was winning the 2010 South Asian Games gold medal for India.

Honours

India
 South Asian Games Gold medal: 2010

References

External links
 AIFF profile

1986 births
Living people
Indian women's footballers
India women's international footballers
India women's youth international footballers
Women's association football defenders
Sportswomen from Bihar
Footballers from Bihar
People from Bettiah
South Asian Games gold medalists for India
South Asian Games medalists in football